Scientigo is a United States company based in Charlotte, North Carolina that began asserting patent claims over XML technology in 2005. Since SGML (Standard Generalized Markup Language), from which XML (Extensible Markup Language) is derived, dates from the 1960s, and the patents were applied for in 1997, the notion that Scientigo's patents cover XML has been rejected by patent attorneys and other commentators including Microsoft.

The company has purchased a 51% stake in the URL find.com. According to Scientigo-issued press releases, they plan to use find.com to utilize their tigo|search technology.

Scientigo received a BERTL award in 2006 for document content retrieval and search technologies.

See also
Software patent
List of software patents
Patent Troll

References

External links
 Official website
 , entitled "Method for modeling, storing, and transferring data in neutral form"
 , a continuation of 

Technology companies of the United States
Companies based in Charlotte, North Carolina
Defunct software companies of the United States